Simona Hösl (born 11 June 1992) is a German alpine ski racer. Hösl specializes in the technical events of Slalom and Giant slalom. Hösl made her World Cup debut on 29 December 2010.

World Cup results

References

External links
 
 Simona Hösl World Cup standings at the International Ski Federation
 

1992 births
Living people
German female alpine skiers
21st-century German women